RT en Español is a  Spanish-language pay television channel of the RT network. RT Spanish was launched in 2009 and is also known as Actualidad RT.

RT Spanish features its own news presenters and programming that differ from the English and Arabic RT channels but also offers translated versions of RT English programming. The channel's focus is on headline news, politics, sports and broadcast specials.

RT Spanish is based in Moscow, and has bureaus in Miami, Los Angeles, Madrid, Managua, Caracas, Havana and Buenos Aires.

Currently RT Spanish has a staff of nearly 200 people, including 35 foreign journalists from Spain, Argentina, the United States, Chile, Nicaragua and Venezuela. It also has journalists from Russia and Serbia who speak Spanish.

History
On 15 June 2006 the Financial Times reported that Russia was considering plans to create a channel in Spanish. This was officially announced in 2007 and the December 28, 2009 began streaming.

Coverage
In Spain you can see on TV Orange, Vodafone and Movistar TV +, Telecable, among others. Also, can you tune into satellite and several subscription television companies in Latin America.7 In Vodafone Spain (ex ONO TV) began broadcasting in December 2010.

During Vladimir Putin's visit to Cristina Fernandez de Kirchner on July 12, 2014 in Buenos Aires, it was announced that the signal would be available at the Open Digital TV for free. The signal entered on the grid on October 10, 2014, becoming the first media produced outside Latin America to enter the state television network in Argentina, as the Telesur channel (which is another international channel that broadcasts in TDA) occurs in Venezuela and is funded in part by the Argentine government and other Latin Americans. RT reaches not only Argentina but also Venezuela, which since 1 December 2014 in the TDA and transmits through the air on DirecTV, which incorporated it to its channel grid.

Since May 2015, RT is transmitted in high definition in Chile through the GTD group. By mid-2015, at the end of March 2016 Ecuador RT enters through Cable TV Group one of the largest operators in the country. RT Spanish was available in more than 900 private television operators in Latin America and Spain. In addition, national channels of Venezuela and Cuba emit a part of the program of the Russian chain.

On June 9, 2016, the Argentine government of Mauricio Macri, through the Federal System and Public Files Media announced the suspension of the signal RT in the TDA. Victoria Vorontsova, director of the Russian channel broadcast said that the Argentine government had approached the United States and would not be surprised that "at that frequency appear CNN rather than a regional channel." The same happened with the signal of Telesur. Hernán Lombardi, head of the Argentine public media, announced a review of the matter. Martin Sabbatella, former head of AFSCA had stated that failure was due to an alignment of the Argentine government with the United States. Finally, he carried out an agreement where the signal TDA remained in Argentina. In addition an exchange of programming projects, and reciprocity agreed to spread the Argentine content in Russia and several co-productions.
On July 13, 2016 RT arrival was announced to Mexico through the cable operator Izzi Telecom one of the cable operators pay the largest northern country.

On July 13, 2016 RT arrival was announced to Mexico through the cable operator Izzi Telecom one of the cable operators pay the largest northern country.

In response to the 2022 Russian invasion of Ukraine, the European Union (EU) announced on February 27, 2022 that they have banned RT and Sputnik in all languages throughout all their member states. This effectively ends broadcasts of RT en Español in Spain which the country is an EU member state though broadcasts continue to air in Latin America.

Programming
Channel programming is made taking into account the time difference between the transmission regions. All news is broadcast during prime time morning or evening in New York, Miami, Los Angeles, Mexico, Buenos Aires and Madrid. RT transmissions include daily sports news, feature stories about life in the Russian regions and interviews with personalities of interest.

Behind the news: the program of the attorney and author Eva Golinger .
Report RT: RT journalists share their impressions of working in different parts of the world.
Keiser Report: Economic Analysis of Max Keiser and Stacy Herbert
Erick list: presents reports on the most interesting and attractive in Russia
Interview: a series of programs where people from the most varied spheres tells stories of his life.
Sports reports: the scores of each week
Special: special reports presenting the viewpoint of RT on past events and a thorough analysis of what is happening in the present.
Technology: the latest achievements and perspective in different areas of Russian science
A day with ... : Eva Golinger spends a day with some of the most important personalities of the world today.
RT Research: Journalist turns detective
Out of box: a series of interviews with RT correspondents who will relate how they lived experience of covering the most important news
A background: a series of programs featuring a tour of the major cities and remote corners of Russia.
Beyond Moscow: tourism program.
Political cuisine: the Betzabé Zumaya program.
El Zoom: presented by Javier Rodríguez Carrasco.
Letters on the table: led by Luis Castro program where they meet with experts and specialists comment on Latin American politics.
Talking with Correa: a weekly program hosted by former president Rafael Correa.
Outside the box: a series of interviews with RT correspondents that will tell how they lived the experience of covering the most important news.

Importance
Latin America is the second most significant area of influence for internet RT (rt.com). In 2013, RT ascended to the ranks of the 100 most watched websites in seven Latin American countries.

References

External links
 

RT (TV network)
 Television channels in Russia
Spanish-language television stations